Mystery Lab is a Brazilian educational web television series that is set to premiere on Netflix on August 4, 2020. The series was created by YouTuber Felipe Castanhari, who also serves as presenter.

The first season features 8 episodes which follows some of humanity's most intriguing mysteries. Among the topics dealt with are the disappearances in the Bermuda Triangle, time travel, the Bubonic plague and the possibility of a zombie apocalypse.

Cast
 Felipe Castanhari 
 Bruno Miranda as Betinho
 Lilian Regina as Dr. Thay
 Guilherme Briggs as Briggs

Episodes

References

External links
 
 

2020s Brazilian television series
2020 Brazilian television series debuts
Brazilian educational television series
Portuguese-language Netflix original programming